The first annual MTV Africa Music Awards took place on November 22, 2008 in Abuja, Nigeria at The Velodrome. The show was hosted by Trevor Nelson. The nominees were announced on October 7, 2008.

Nominations

Artist of the Year
Aṣa
D'banj
P-Square
HHP 
Seether

Best Video
Movaizhaleine — "Nous"
Ikechukwu — "Wind Am Well"
P-Square — "Roll It"
Freshlyground — "Pot Belly"
Pro Kid — "Uthini Ngo Pro"

Best Female
Wahu
Aṣa
Dama Do Bling
Sasha P
Zonke

Best Male
Jua Cali
2Face 
D'banj 
DJ Cleo
HHP

Best Group
P-Square 
Freshly Ground 
Jozi
The Parlotones
East African Bashment Crew

Best New Act
Kwaw Kese 
Wahu 
9ice 
Naeto C 
Da L.E.S.

Best Alternative
Buraka Som Sistema
Goldfish 
Seether 
The Parlotones 
Coldplay

Best Hip-Hop
9ice
HHP 
Professor Jay 
Lil Wayne
The Game

Best R&B
P-Square 
Akon 
Loyiso 
Alicia Keys 
Rihanna

Best Live Performer
Samini
D'banj
P-Square
Cassette 
Jozi

Listener's choice award
Jax Panik — "Cigarettes and Cinnamon"
D'banj — "Why Me"
Naakaya — "Mr. Politician"
JB Mpiana — "Zadio Kongolo"
P Unit (featuring DNA) — "Una"
Toniks — "Beera Nange"
Ofori Amponsah (featuring Samini) — "Odwo"

MAMA legend award
Fela Kuti

My Video
Jide Rotilu??, Adetoro Rotilu ??, Razor Blee G

References

2008 music awards
2008 in Africa
MTV Africa Music Awards
2008 in Nigerian music
November 2008 events in Africa